Sarp Ağabigün (born 12 June 1997) is a Turkish tennis player.

Ağabigün has a career high ATP singles ranking of 831 achieved on 16 October 2017. He also has a career high ATP doubles ranking of 322 achieved on 27 June 2016.

Ağabigün made his ATP main draw debut at the 2017 Antalya Open in the doubles draw partnering Altuğ Çelikbilek. He has represented Turkey at the Davis Cup, where he has a win–loss record of 1–0.

Career titles

Doubles

External links

1997 births
Living people
Turkish male tennis players
Sportspeople from Istanbul
Competitors at the 2018 Mediterranean Games
Mediterranean Games bronze medalists for Turkey
Mediterranean Games medalists in tennis